The first season of NCIS: New Orleans, an American police procedural drama television series, originally aired on CBS from September 23, 2014, through May 12, 2015. The season was produced by CBS Television Studios, with Gary Glasberg as showrunner and executive producer. The pilot was aired on March 25, 2014, to April 1, 2014, serves as the first of a two-part backdoor pilot during the eleventh season of NCIS and ordered to series in May 2014. On October 27, 2014, CBS picked up NCIS: New Orleans for a full season of 23 episodes.

Plot 
The first season of NCIS: New Orleans follows the work of Special Agent Dwayne Pride, who leads a New Orleans-based investigative team tasked with solving crimes involving the US Navy and Marine Corps. Pride and Chris LaSalle work alongside new-transfer Meredith Brody, as they face the loss of friends ("Musician Heal Thyself"), battle a suspected plague outbreak ("Carrier"), and investigate cases including a brig break ("Breaking Brig"), a murder at a sorority house ("The Recruits"), a kidnapping that brings the FBI to New Orleans ("It Happened Last Night"), a murder at a cemetery on Halloween ("Master of Horror"), a death at Mardi Gras ("Love Hurts"), a bomber targeting Pride and his family ("Baitfish"), a case that calls for NCIS to work alongside CGIS ("The Abyss"), and a sailor who asks for his own murder to be investigated ("The Walking Dead"), all while facing the death of loved ones ("How Much Pain Can You Take?").

Cast and characters

Main
 Scott Bakula as Dwayne Cassius Pride, NCIS Supervisory Special Agent (SSA) assigned to the New Orleans Office
 Lucas Black as Christopher LaSalle, NCIS Senior Special Agent, second in command
 Zoe McLellan as Meredith Brody, NCIS Special Agent from the closed Chicago Field Office, recruited to the New Orleans office
 Rob Kerkovich as Sebastian Lund, Jefferson Parish Forensic Specialist for NCIS
 C. C. H. Pounder as Loretta Wade, Jefferson Parish Medical Examiner for NCIS

Recurring
 Shalita Grant as Sonja Percy, ATF Special Agent
 Daryl Mitchell as Patton Plame, NCIS Computer Specialist 
 Shanley Caswell as Laurel Pride, Dwayne Pride's daughter
 Callie Thorne as Sasha Broussard, former member of the New Orleans Broussard crime syndicate
 Steven Weber as Douglas Hamilton, Republican New Orleans city councilman of District C.
 John Livingston as Paul Jenks, former member of the New Orleans Broussard crime syndicate and Confidential Informant for Dwayne Pride
 Gillian Alexy as Savannah Kelly, long time love interest of LaSalle
 Dylan Walsh as Jim Messier, Captain with New Orleans Police Department
 Clayne Crawford as Cade LaSalle, Christopher LaSalle's brother 
 Dean Stockwell as Tom Hamilton, Douglas' father
 Christopher Meyer as Danny Malloy, Loretta's eldest foster son (C.J.'s brother)
 Dani Dare as C.J. Malloy, Loretta's youngest foster son (Danny's brother)
 Stacy Keach as Cassius Pride, Dwayne Pride's imprisoned father

Guests
 Mark Harmon as Leroy Jethro Gibbs, NCIS Supervisory Special Agent (SSA) of the Major Case Response Team (MCRT) assigned to Washington's Navy Yard
 Michael Weatherly as Anthony DiNozzo, NCIS Special Agent, second in command of MCRT
 Pauley Perrette as Abigail Sciuto, Forensic Specialist for NCIS in D.C.
 Rocky Carroll as Leon Vance, NCIS Director stationed in D.C.
 David McCallum as Dr. Donald Mallard, Chief Medical Examiner for NCIS in Washington, D.C.
 Joe Spano as Tobias Fornell, FBI Senior Special Agent from D.C.
 Diane Neal as Abigail Borin, CGIS Special Agent in Charge
 Meredith Eaton as Carol Wilson, immunologist and friend of Abby Sciuto

Episodes

Production

Development
In September 2013, NCIS: New Orleans will be introduced with a two-part backdoor pilot during the eleventh season of NCIS. The episode title "Crescent City (Part I)" and "Crescent City (Part II)", written by Gary Glasberg, which aired on March 25, 2014, to April 1, 2014, a second spin off from NCIS and set filmed located in New Orleans. NCIS: New Orleans was ordered to series on May 9, 2014. On October 27, 2014, CBS picked up NCIS: New Orleans for a full season of 23 episodes.

Casting
In February 2014, the pilot was cast with Scott Bakula, CCH Pounder, and Zoe McLellan as Dwayne Pride, Loretta Wade, and Meredith Brody, Lucas Black as Christopher LaSalle, and Rob Kerkovich as Sebastian Lund a forensic scientist.

Broadcast
Season one of NCIS: New Orleans premiered on CBS in the United States on Tuesday, September 23, 2014, with the season twelfth premiere of NCIS as its lead-in.

Reception

Ratings

Critical reception
NCIS: New Orleans has received mixed reviews from critics. Review aggregator Rotten Tomatoes gives the first season of the show a rating of 65%, based on 26 reviews, with an average rating of 5.4/10. The site's consensus reads, "With a solid cast in a beautiful locale, NCIS: New Orleans makes extending this well-worn franchise look like the Big Easy." Metacritic gives the show a score of 55 out of 100, based on 15 critics, indicating "mixed or average reviews".

In late September 2014, The Wraps journalist Jason Hughes reviewed the pilot episode of the series, praising the music, the use of the city of New Orleans, and CBS' decision to cast Scott Bakula as "one of the most likable leading men in television, so they're set there." David Hinckley of the New York Daily News gave a mixed but critical review of the pilot episode, saying there is a "Crescent City flavor here. But in the larger picture, not much on this menu is unfamiliar." Liz Shannon Miller and Ben Travers of Indiewire said that NCIS is like "the obelisk in 2001: A Space Odyssey, it's an awe-inspiring, inescapable presence in the broadcast line-up. NCIS on CBS: It is here. It has always been here. It forever will be."

References

General

External links
 
 

01
2014 American television seasons
2015 American television seasons